In music, Op. 86 stands for Opus number 86. Compositions that are assigned this number include:

 Beethoven – Mass in C major
 Dvořák – Mass in D major
 Prokofiev – Betrothal in a Monastery
 Schumann – Konzertstück for Four Horns and Orchestra
 Strauss – Divertimento for Chamber Orchestra after Keyboard Pieces by Couperin